Jörg Hahnel (born 11 January 1982 in Erla) is a German former professional footballer who played as a goalkeeper.

References

External links 
 
 

1982 births
Living people
People from Schwarzenberg, Saxony
German footballers
Association football goalkeepers
FC Erzgebirge Aue players
FC Hansa Rostock players
Bundesliga players
2. Bundesliga players
3. Liga players
Regionalliga players
Footballers from Saxony